K210 or K-210 may refer to:

K-210 (Kansas highway), a former state highway in Kansas
HMS Thyme (K210), a former UK Royal Navy ship